Still the Same... Great Rock Classics of Our Time is the 24th album by Rod Stewart, released on 10 October 2006. After four years of success singing pop standards from the Great American Songbook, Still the Same was composed of classic rock covers.

The album is produced by Clive Davis and John Shanks (the former also produced the American Songbook albums) and includes rock milestones from the last four decades, including Bonnie Tyler 's "It's a Heartache", Badfinger's "Day After Day" and Creedence Clearwater Revival's classic "Have You Ever Seen the Rain?", which was picked as the first single from the album.

The album debuted at number one on the Billboard 200 albums chart with 184,000 copies sold, making it his fifth top 5 and second number-one debut in three years. Stewart said he was "extremely happy" with the accomplishment. The album also reached number one on the New Zealand RIANZ albums chart and was certified 2× Platinum for sales of 30,000 copies.

Track listing
 "Have You Ever Seen the Rain?" (John Fogerty) – 3:12
 "Fooled Around and Fell in Love" (Elvin Bishop) – 3:48
 "I'll Stand by You" (Chrissie Hynde, Thomas Kelly, William Steinberg) – 4:29
 "Still the Same" (Bob Seger) – 3:38
 "It's a Heartache" (Ronnie Scott, Steve Wolfe) – 3:32
 "Day After Day" (Peter Ham) – 3:07
 "Missing You" (Mark Leonard, Charles Sandford, John Waite) – 4:18
 "Father and Son" (Cat Stevens) – 3:36
 "The Best of My Love" (Don Henley, Glenn Frey, J. D. Souther) – 3:44
 "If Not for You" (Bob Dylan) – 3:36
 "Love Hurts" (Boudleaux Bryant) – 3:47
 "Everything I Own" (David Gates) – 3:06
 "Crazy Love" (Van Morrison) – 2:42
 "Lay Down Sally" (UK Bonus Track) (Eric Clapton, Marcy Levy, George Terry) – 4:00

Personnel

Musicians 

 Rod Stewart – lead vocals 
 Jamie Muhoberac – acoustic piano (1-7, 9–13), Hammond B3 organ (2, 4–7, 9–13), keyboards (3)
 Patrick Warren – keyboards (1, 2, 5, 6, 8, 10–13)
 Mike Finnigan – Hammond B3 organ (5, 13)
 Dean Parks – acoustic guitar (1, 3, 8, 13), electric guitar (2, 4–12)
 Tim Pierce – acoustic guitar (1, 3, 8), electric guitar (2-13)
 John Shanks – acoustic guitar (1, 8), electric guitar (2-13), backing vocals (3, 6, 10, 11)
 Greg Leisz – pedal steel guitar (2, 10, 11), mandolin (5, 10)
 Leland Sklar – bass guitar (1-8, 10–13)
 Paul Bushnell – bass guitar (9)
 Kenny Aronoff – drums (1-11, 13)
 Jeff Rothschild – drums (12)
 Lenny Castro – percussion (2, 4, 5, 7, 9, 10, 12, 13)
 James Grundler – backing vocals (1, 4, 5, 6, 10, 11, 12)
 Julia Waters – backing vocals (2, 3, 4, 10, 11, 13)
 Maxine Waters – backing vocals (2, 3, 4, 10, 11, 13)

Strings (3, 5, 8, 11, 12, 13)
 David Campbell – arrangements 
 Suzie Katayama – contractor
 Charlie Bisharat – concertmaster
 Dave Stone – bass [ tr. 3, 5, 11 - 13]
 Suzie Katayama, Daniel Smith and Yao Zhao – cello
 Denyse Buffum, Cheryl Kohfeld and Kazi Pitelka – viola
 Ruth Bruegger, Susan Chatman, Liliana Filipovic, Laurence Greenfield, Peter Kent, Cameron Patrick, Vladamir Polimitidl, Audrey Solomon, David Stenske, John Wittenberg and Shari Zippert – violin

Production

 Producer – John Shanks
 Co-Producer – Clive Davis 
 A&R – Stephen Ferrera 
 Production Coordinator and Music Contractor – Shari Sutcliffe 
 Engineer – Jeff Rothschild
 Additional Engineer – Mark Valentine
 Assistant Engineers – Keith Gretlein, Derek Karlquist and Tom Syrowski.
 Recorded at Henson Recording Studios (Los Angeles, CA).
 Pro Tools Editing – Lars Fox and John Hanes
 Mixed by Serban Ghenea at MixStar Studios (Virginia Beach, VA), assisted by Kevin Mahoney and Tim Roberts.
 Mastered by Ted Jensen at Sterling Sound (New York, NY).
 Art Direction and Design – Jane Morledge and SMOG Design, Inc.
 Photography – Simon Emmett, Anthony Harvey and John Shanks.
 Groomer – Charlotte Cave 
 Project Manager – Lotus Donovan 
 Executive Assistant – Jackie Oberhauser
 Management – Arnold Stiefel at Stiefel Management.

Charts

Weekly charts

Year-end charts

Certifications

References

2006 albums
Rod Stewart albums
Albums produced by Clive Davis
Albums produced by John Shanks
Albums recorded at A&M Studios
Covers albums